Mary Ada Jarvis Beattie (August 31, 1923 – March 8, 2015) was an American politician.

She grew up in St. Louis, Missouri. Beatie lived in Lake Forest, Illinois with her husband Orville and their family; she served as a foster parent with her husband. Beattie was involved with the Republican Party and served on the Lake County, Illinois County Board. Beattie served in the Illinois House of Representatives, from the 59th district, from January 8, 1999, to January 13, 1999. Beattie was appointed to the Illinois General Assembly succeeding Corrine Wood after Wood's election as Lieutenant Governor of Illinois.

Notes

External links

1923 births
2015 deaths
Politicians from St. Louis
People from Lake Forest, Illinois
Women state legislators in Illinois
County board members in Illinois
Republican Party members of the Illinois House of Representatives
21st-century American women